Robert Hautman is an American painter, residing in western Minnesota. The artist is best known for his realism wildlife art, particularly the US Federal Duck Stamp.  The artist's paintings have been featured on the 2001 and 1997 Federal Duck Stamps, raising millions for conservation. In 2016 he was featured in the documentary The Million Dollar Duck about the contest.

His brothers Joe Hautman and Jim Hautman are also wildlife artists.

See also
 Bonnie, Rebecca and Karen Latham

References

External links
 Official website

Year of birth missing (living people)
Living people
20th-century American painters
American male painters
21st-century American painters
21st-century American male artists
People from Wright County, Minnesota
Painters from Minnesota
American bird artists
20th-century American male artists